Neoregelia angustibracteolata is a species of flowering plant in the genus Neoregelia. This species is endemic to Brazil.

References 

angustibracteolata
Flora of Brazil